Rendezvous in Rio is a jazz vocal album by Michael Franks, released in 2006 with Koch Records. It was Franks' sixteenth studio album.

Track listing

References

Bibliography

Michael Franks (musician) albums
2006 albums
E1 Music albums